Thomas Falcon Marshall (1818–1878) was an English artist, known as a painter in oils and watercolour. He painted both portraits and landscapes, and also history paintings.

Life
Marshall was born in Liverpool, in December 1818, and he worked mainly there and in Manchester. In the Liverpool Academy Exhibition of 1836 he showed four pictures. In 1840 he was awarded a silver medal by the Society of Arts for an oil-painting of a figure subject, and he exhibited for the first of many times at the Royal Academy in 1839. Around 1847 he moved to London.

Marshall died in Kensington on 26 March 1878.

Works

At the Royal Academy Marshall exhibited in all 60 works, at the British Institute 40 paintings, and 42 at the Suffolk Street Gallery. He was also well represented at Liverpool and Manchester exhibitions.  The Coming Footstep (1847) went to the national collection in South Kensington. Emigration – The Parting Day and Sad News from the Seat of War were other well-known examples of his work.

Family
Marshall was married. His wife, Amelia Jane, survived him, as did a son.

Notes

External links
Attribution

1818 births
1878 deaths
English painters
British portrait painters
English watercolourists